Rhazya is a genus of plant in family Apocynaceae first described as a genus in 1835. It is native to Egypt and to southwestern Asia from Yemen  to India.

Species
 Rhazya greissii Täckh. & Boulos - Kharga Oasis in Egypt 
 Rhazya stricta Decne. - Yemen, Saudi Arabia, Oman, Persian Gulf sheikdoms, Iraq, Iran, Afghanistan, Pakistan, India, Western Himalayas

References

Rauvolfioideae
Apocynaceae genera
Taxa named by Joseph Decaisne